The Brazil men's national artistic gymnastics team represents Brazil in FIG international competitions.

History
Brazil has participated in the Olympic Games men's team competition twice. It has also participated in the men's team competition at the World Artistic Gymnastics Championships ? times.  At the 2012 Olympic Games, Arthur Zanetti became the first Brazilian to win an Olympic medal in men's artistic gymnastics, winning gold in the rings.

Current roster

Team competition results

Olympic Games

 1896 through 2012 — did not participate
 2016 — 6th place
Francisco Barretto Júnior, Diego Hypólito, Arthur Nory, Sérgio Sasaki, Arthur Zanetti
 2020 — R1
Francisco Barretto Júnior, Arthur Nory, Diogo Soares, Caio Souza

World Championships

 2010 — 19th place
Danilo Nogueira, Felipe Polato, Francisco Barretto Júnior, Mosiah Rodrigues, Pericles Silva, Sérgio Sasaki
 2011 — 13th place
Arthur Zanetti, Diego Hypólito, Francisco Barretto Júnior, Pericles Silva, Petrix Barbosa, Sérgio Sasaki
 2014 — 6th place
Arthur Nory, Arthur Zanetti, Diego Hypólito, Francisco Barretto Júnior, Lucas Bitencourt, Sérgio Sasaki
 2015 — 8th place
Arthur Nory, Arthur Zanetti, Caio Souza, Diego Hypólito, Francisco Barretto Júnior, Lucas Bitencourt
 2018 — 7th place
Arthur Nory, Arthur Zanetti, Caio Souza, Francisco Barretto Júnior, Lucas Bitencourt
 2019 — R2
Arthur Nory, Arthur Zanetti, Caio Souza, Francisco Barretto Júnior, Lucas Bitencourt
 2022 — 7th place
Arthur Nory, Caio Souza, Diogo Soares, Lucas Bitencourt, Yuri Guimarães. Alternate: Patrick Sampaio

Most decorated gymnasts

This list includes all Brazilian female artistic gymnasts who have won a medal at the Olympic Games, the World Artistic Gymnastics Championships or the FIG World Cup Final from 1975 to 2008.

Best international results

See also
Brazil women's national artistic gymnastics team
Brazil at the World Artistic Gymnastics Championships
Gymnastics at the Pan American Games
Gymnastics at the South American Games
Pan American Gymnastics Championships
South American Gymnastics Championships
List of Olympic female artistic gymnasts for Brazil

References

Gymnastics
Gymnastics in Brazil